Geoffrey Bowes is a Canadian actor. He is most noted for his performance in the 1979 film Something's Rotten, for which he received a Genie Award nomination for Best Actor at the 1st Genie Awards in 1980.

Career 
Bowes's roles have included the films Fish Hawk, Middle Age Crazy, War Brides, Jewel, Dirty Pictures and Say Nothing, supporting or guest appearances in the television series Street Legal, F/X: The Series, Wind at My Back, Due South, Degrassi: The Next Generation and This Is Wonderland, voice roles in Babar and The Neverending Story, and stage roles in productions of Thomas Babe's A Prayer for My Daughter, Erika Ritter's Automatic Pilot, David Fennario's Toronto, George F. Walker's Zastrozzi: The Master of Discipline, and Brian Drader's The Norbals. He won a Dora Mavor Moore Award in 1981, as Outstanding Featured Performer in a Play, for his performance in Automatic Pilot.

Now semi-retired from acting, he launched his own home renovation company in 2014. In 2018, he published Open Up the Wall, a memoir of his work as a contractor.

Filmography

Film

Television

References

External links

20th-century Canadian male actors
21st-century Canadian male actors
21st-century Canadian male writers
21st-century Canadian non-fiction writers
Canadian male film actors
Canadian male stage actors
Canadian male television actors
Canadian male voice actors
Canadian male non-fiction writers
Canadian memoirists
Dora Mavor Moore Award winners
Male actors from Ontario
Living people
National Theatre School of Canada alumni
21st-century memoirists
Year of birth missing (living people)